Dutee Chand (born 3 February 1996) is an Indian professional sprinter and current national champion in the women's 100 metres event. She is the first Indian to win a gold medal in 100m race in a global competition. She is the third Indian woman to ever qualify for the Women's 100 metres event at the Summer Olympic Games. However, in the 2016 Summer Olympics, her 11.69 s in the preliminary round did not qualify her for the next round. In 2018, Chand clinched silver in women's 100m at the Jakarta Asian Games. It was India's first medal in this event since 1998. In 2019, she became the first Indian sprinter to win gold at the Universiade, clocking 11.32 seconds in the 100 m race.

She is the reigning national champion in the 100 m event. Chand, who was once forced to sit out due to the IAAF hyperandrogenism regulations, qualified for the Women's 100 m event at the 2016 Rio Olympics, 36 years after P. T. Usha took part in the 1980 Moscow Olympics. In 2016, she was appointed as an assistant manager in the state government-run Odisha Mining Corporation (OMC).

Dutee is also India's first athlete to openly come out as a member of the LGBTQ+ community, when she spoke about being in a same-sex relationship in 2019. Later that year, she signed up a two-year deal with sportswear brand Puma to endorse their products.

Early life
Chand was born on 3 February 1996 to Chakradhar Chand and Akhuji Chand in the Chaka Gopalpur village, Jajpur district of Odisha. She is from a below poverty line weavers family. Her source of inspiration is her older sister Saraswati Chand, who competed in running at state level. Chand and her elder sister Saraswati were enrolled in a government sports hostel in 2006.

Career

2012–2013
In 2012, Dutee Chand became a national champion in the under-18 category, when she clocked 11.85 seconds in the 100 metres event.

Clocking 23.811 seconds, Chand won the bronze in the Women's 200 metres event at the 2013 Asian Athletics Championships at Pune. The year also saw her become the first Indian to reach the final of a global athletics 100 metres final, when she reached the final in the 2013 World Youth Championships. In the same year, she became the national champion in 100 metres and 200 metres when she won the events clocking 11.73 s in the final in 100 metres and a career-best 23.73 s in 200 metres at the National Senior Athletics Championships at Ranchi.

2014 hyperandrogenism controversy
In June 2014, she won two gold medals at Asian Junior Athletics Championships in 200 metres and 4 × 400 m relays. In the 200 m event she bettered her previous timing to 23.74 secs and hoping to get qualified for the Commonwealth Games but Chand was dropped from the 2014 Commonwealth Games contingent at the last minute after the Athletic Federation of India stated that hyperandrogenism made her ineligible to compete as a female athlete. Following the Commonwealth Games she was also dropped from the Indian contingent for the 2014 Asian Games. There was no suggestion that Chand was involved in cheating or doping, and the decision was widely criticized by intersex advocates.

2015 testosterone rule change 
Chand appealed to the Court of Arbitration for Sport (CAS). The Canadian law firm Davies, Ward, Philips & Vineberg, LLP represented her on a pro bono basis. The IAAF policy on hyperandrogenism, or high natural levels of testosterone in women, was suspended following the case of Dutee Chand v. Athletics Federation of India (AFI) & The International Association of Athletics Federations (IAAF), in the Court of Arbitration for Sport, decided in July 2015. The ruling found that there was a lack of evidence provided that testosterone increased female athletic performance and notified the IAAF that it had two years to provide the evidence. This effectively removed the suspension of Chand from competition, clearing her to race again.

Santhi Soundarajan, an Indian middle-distance runner, extended her support to Chand, saying that Chand should not be "victimized". She said that steps should be taken to ensure Chand's return to the track.

2016
Following the hyperandrogenism rule change, Chand resumed competing and participated at the 2016 Asian Indoor Athletics Championships in 60 metres where in the qualification round she set the Indian national record clocking in at 7.28 secs and went on to win the bronze medal in the final with a time of 7.37 secs.

Dutee clocked 11.33 secs in women's 100m dash to win the gold and erase Rachita Mistry’s 16-year-old earlier national record of 11.38 s in the 2016 Federation Cup National Athletics Championships in New Delhi, however she missed the Rio Olympics qualification norm of 11.32 s by one-hundredth of a second. But finally on 25 June 2016, Dutee broke the same National record twice in one day after clocking 11.24 at the XXVI International Meeting G Kosanov Memorial at Almaty, Kazakhstan, thereby qualifying for the Olympic Games. "I am really happy at the moment, it has been a tough year for me and I am so happy that my coach ... and my hard work has paid off. I would like to thank all the people in India who were praying for me to qualify. Your wishes have paid off."

At Rio 2016 Olympics, she became the third Indian woman to participate in the Women's 100 metres, though she did not move beyond the heats, where she clocked 11.69 seconds.

Since Rio, Chand has been training at Hyderabad with young athletes, most notable among them Indian Badminton Star P. V. Sindhu.

2017−present

In 2017, at the Asian Athletics Championships she clinched two bronze medals, one in the Women's 100 metres, another in the Women's 4 × 100 m relay with Srabani Nanda, Merlin K Joseph, and Himashree Roy at Bhubaneswar.

At the 2018 Asian Games, in the Women's 100 metres finals, Chand won the silver medal, her first Asian games medal, clocking 11.32 sec on 26 August. Again on 29 August, she bagged her second silver at the Asian games in the Women's 200 metres final. Her silver in 100 m, was India's silver medal in this category after 32 years since P.T.Usha won in 1986 and Chand's first medal in the Asian games as she was banned in 2014 and her 200 m silver is after 16 years for India since Saraswati Saha's gold in 2002 at Busan.

As she won these two medals after a long court battle, she expressed her concern about her future saying, "My legal team helped me to come back. But nobody could guarantee what will happen in the future." Citing Caster Semenya's ongoing fight, she said, "Caster Semenya is still fighting. There is always fear but you need to overcome it."

At the 2019 Summer Universiade in Napoli, Chand won gold in the 100m race, becoming the first Indian woman sprinter to win gold at the Universiade. She finished the sprint in 11.32 seconds. She was also the flag-bearer during the opening ceremony of the event.

Television

Support to Caster Semenya
Caster Semenya is the 2012 and 2016 Olympic champion and former world champion in women's 800 metres. She is also affected by the hyperandrogenism rule of IAAF like Dutee but faced a different fate. In April 2018, the IAAF announced new rules that required hyperandrogenous athletes to take medication to lower their testosterone levels, effective beginning in November 2018. Due to the narrow scope of the changes, which only apply to athletes competing in the 400 m, 800 m, and 1500 m, many people thought the rule change was designed specifically to target Semenya. 
At an interview to The Indian Express, Chand expressed her pain and struggle of four years, when she was controversially not allowed to compete in any international events due to hyperandrogenism. "These four years have been extremely tough for me. The negativity, fear of my career ending prematurely, insensitive comments about my body, I have faced them all. I am extremely relieved that I can run fearlessly again, knowing that now my battle exists only on the track and not off it."

Personal life 
In 2013, she enrolled in the KIIT University to study law. She is presently employed as an executive officer in the state PSU The Odisha Mining Corporation Ltd.

In 2019, she became India's first ever openly queer athlete as she publicly stated that she is in a same-sex relationship, saying that the Indian Supreme Court's decision to decriminalise gay sex in 2018 encouraged her to speak publicly about her sexuality, mentioning that she was in a same-sex relationship. Chand faced severe backlash from her home village after her announcement, whose residents disavowed her remarks and called them "humiliating". Her eldest sister had threatened to expel her from the family.

On 18 January 2023 it was announced that Chand had tested positive for three different prohibited substances.

International competitions

Legend
H − Heats/qualification rounds
SF − Semi-finals
FL − Finals
NR − National record
PB − Personal best

Awards and honours
  from the Government of Orissa for winning silver medals at the 2018 Asian Games.

Endorsement deal 
In August 2019, prominent sportswear brand Puma signed Chand for two years to endorse their products.

See also 

Rashmi Rocket, Indian sports drama film about sex verification in sports
Caster Semenya
Santhi Soundarajan
Maria José Martínez-Patiño

References

External links
 
 
 

1996 births
Living people
Indian female sprinters
21st-century Indian women
21st-century Indian people
Sportswomen from Odisha
People from Jajpur district
Sex verification in sports
Athletes (track and field) at the 2016 Summer Olympics
Athletes (track and field) at the 2020 Summer Olympics
Olympic athletes of India
Athletes from Odisha
Athletes (track and field) at the 2018 Asian Games
Asian Games silver medalists for India
Asian Games medalists in athletics (track and field)
Queer women
Medalists at the 2018 Asian Games
Indian LGBT sportspeople
Indian lesbians
LGBT track and field athletes
Universiade gold medalists in athletics (track and field)
Universiade medalists for India
South Asian Games silver medalists for India
South Asian Games bronze medalists for India
South Asian Games medalists in athletics
Medalists at the 2019 Summer Universiade
Athletes (track and field) at the 2022 Commonwealth Games
Commonwealth Games competitors for India
Kalinga Institute of Industrial Technology alumni
Recipients of the Arjuna Award
Olympic female sprinters
21st-century Indian LGBT people
Lesbian sportswomen